Elizabeth Ann "Betsy" Beard (born September 16, 1961) is a former American competitive coxswain and Olympic gold medalist.

Beard was born in Baltimore, Maryland, United States in 1961. She was a member of the American women's eight team that won the gold medal at the 1984 Summer Olympics in Los Angeles, California. She was the cox for the American women's eight at World Rowing Championships in 1985, 1986, and 1987, and the team came fourth at the first two competitions, and won silver in 1987. At the 1988 Summer Olympics, she came in sixth with the women's eight.

References

1961 births
Living people
Sportspeople from Baltimore
American female rowers
Coxswains (rowing)
Rowers at the 1984 Summer Olympics
Rowers at the 1988 Summer Olympics
Olympic gold medalists for the United States in rowing
Medalists at the 1984 Summer Olympics
World Rowing Championships medalists for the United States
21st-century American women